This is an alphabetical list of works performed by The Royal Ballet, a classical ballet company based at the Royal Opera House, Covent Garden, London, in the United Kingdom.

A 

Works performed by The Royal Ballet, List of
Royal Ballet, List of works performed by The